Gand may refer to:

 Ghent (French: Gand), a city in Belgium
 Gand (Star Wars), a fictional planet and its resident species in the Star Wars franchise
 Gand., the standard author abbreviation for Michel Gandoger
 , Old Norse word for "wand" or "staff" which is incorporated into the names of many Norse mythological and legendary figures; see Gandalf (mythology)
 Gands, the human colonists of a planet in the novel The Great Explosion by Eric Frank Russell
 Gand., Northern English slang referring to a good throw. Thought to have originated from Lancashire dialect. Frequently edited by Fyrael who takes particular offence to the addition.
 GAND., stands for GATAD2B-associated neurodevelopmental disorder.